This list of people killed by law enforcement officers in the United Kingdom documents cases of people who died directly or indirectly because of the actions of British law enforcement officers, regardless of the manner of death, duty status of the officers, or if they acted officially or unofficially. It includes officers working for all law enforcement agencies, existing or historical, in England, Wales, Scotland, and Northern Ireland, but excludes crown dependencies, colonies or other political entities subject or previously subjected to the direct control of the government of the United Kingdom. It also excludes deaths for which other government agents are responsible, such as deaths as a result of actions of the British Armed Forces.

Many of the killings were by the Royal Ulster Constabulary (RUC) during the Troubles in Northern Ireland. Police in Northern Ireland killed 56 people during the conflict, including at least 30 civilians and at least 20 paramilitary members.

Single deaths in a single incident

2020s

2010s

2000s

1990s

1980s
 Seamus Duffy (9 August 1989 in Belfast, Northern Ireland) – Catholic civilian, shot by plastic bullet.
 Keith White (14 April 1986 in Portadown, Northern Ireland) – Protestant civilian, shot by plastic bullet during a riot.
 Cherry Groce (28 September 1985 in Lambeth, London)
 John Shorthouse (24 August 1985 in Birmingham, England)
 John Mikkelson, misadventure(July 1985 in London)
 Henry Foley (12 February 1985 in Southport, England) – severely beaten in police cell by officer, died of injuries in hospital. First time a UK police officer was convicted for a death in custody.
 Gerard Logue (8 February 1985 in Belfast, Northern Ireland) – shot while sitting in a stolen car.
 Sean McIlvenna (17 December 1984 in Blackwatertown, Northern Ireland) – IRA member, shot after being involved in a roadside bomb attack.
 Sean Downes (12 August 1984 in Belfast, Northern Ireland) – Catholic civilian, shot by plastic bullet during protest march.
 Paul McCann (15 June 1984 in Belfast, Northern Ireland) – INLA member, shot during gun battle after police surrounded a house.
 Seamus Fitzsimmons (14 May 1984 in Ballygally, Northern Ireland) – Catholic civilian, shot during attempted post office robbery.
 Anthony Dawson (12 December 1983 in Belfast, Northern Ireland) – Catholic civilian, killed in drive-by shooting by an off-duty police officer.
 Brigid Foster (28 November 1983 in Pomeroy, Northern Ireland) – passerby, shot after armed robbery at post office.
 John O'Hare (26 July 1983 in Lurgan, Northern Ireland) – Catholic civilian, shot while running away after armed post office robbery.
 William Miller (16 March 1983 in Belfast, Northern Ireland) – UVF member, shot while traveling in stolen car.
 Frank McColgan (20 January 1983 in Dunmurry, Northern Ireland) – Catholic civilian, shot during car chase.
 Michael Tighe (24 November 1982 in Derrymacash, Northern Ireland) – Catholic civilian, shot by undercover officers at a farm.
 Ronald Brennan (28 September 1982 in Newtownabbey, Northern Ireland) – Protestant civilian, shot during attempted post office robbery.
 Stephen Hamilton (19 October 1981 in Belfast, Northern Ireland) – UDA member, shot while traveling in stolen car.
 Peter McGuinness (9 August 1981 in Belfast, Northern Ireland) – Catholic civilian, died after being shot by plastic bullet.
 Nora McCabe (9 July 1981 in Belfast, Northern Ireland) – Catholic civilian, died after being shot by plastic bullet.
 Paul Whitters (25 April 1981 in Derry, Northern Ireland) – Catholic civilian, died after being shot by plastic bullet.
 Michael McCartan (24 July 1980 in Belfast, Northern Ireland) – Catholic civilian, shot by undercover officer.
 Terence O'Neill (1 July 1980 in Belfast, Northern Ireland) – IRA member, shot while running away from a community centre.
 Gail Kinchen (Shot 11 June 1980 in Birmingham, England. Died 4 weeks later) - Whilst being used as a human shield by David Pagett, Pagett discharged his shotgun, police officers returned fire hitting Gail three times.

1970s
 James Kelly, killed in police custody (21 June 1979 in Liverpool, England)
 Blair Peach (died 24 April 1979 in London, England)
 William Strathearn (19 April 1977 in Ahoghill, Northern Ireland) – shot at his home by off-duty officers.
 William "Billy" Hughes (14 January 1977, Rainow, Cheshire) – escaped prisoner, and mass murderer, shot dead by police marksman following a high speed pursuit.
 Edward Walker (11 June 1976 in Newtownabbey, Northern Ireland) – UDA member, shot while traveling in stolen car.
 Sean McDermott (5 April 1976 in Dunmurry, Northern Ireland) – IRA member, shot shortly after carrying out bomb attack on a hotel.
 Liddle Towers (9 February 1976 in Dryburn Hospital, County Durham, England) - died of injuries inflicted during a beating by police in cells.
 Michael McVerry (15 November 1973 in Keady, Northern Ireland) – IRA member, shot during attack on police/army base.
 Michael Leonard (17 May 1973 in Pettigo, Northern Ireland) – shot while driving his car being chased by police.
 Albert Kavanagh (4 March 1972 in Belfast, Northern Ireland) – IRA member, shot during attempted bomb attack on factory.
 Joseph Cunningham (10 February 1972 in Newtownabbey, Northern Ireland) – IRA member, shot during gun battle.
 Martin Forsythe (24 October 1971 in Belfast Northern Ireland) – IRA member, shot by undercover officers during bomb attack.

1960s
 Michael Lynch (15 August 1969 in Belfast, Northern Ireland) – Catholic civilian, shot during the 1969 Northern Ireland riots.
 Samuel McLarnon (15 August 1969 in Belfast, Northern Ireland) – Catholic civilian, shot during the 1969 Northern Ireland riots.
 Hugh McCabe (15 August 1969 in Belfast, Northern Ireland) – British soldier on leave, shot while standing on a roof during the 1969 Northern Ireland riots.
 Patrick Rooney (14 August 1969 in Belfast, Northern Ireland) – 9-year-old boy shot during the 1969 Northern Ireland riots.
 John Gallagher (14 August 1969 in Armagh, Northern Ireland) – Catholic civilian, shot during the 1969 Northern Ireland riots.
 Samuel Devenney (17 July 1969 in Derry, Northern Ireland) – Catholic civilian, died three months after being badly beaten by officers inside his home during a riot.
 James Griffiths (15 July 1969 in Glasgow, Scotland)
 Francis McCloskey (14 July 1969 in Dungiven, Northern Ireland) – Catholic civilian, died after being hit on head with batons during a riot.

Before the 1960s
James Crossan (24 August 1958 in Mullan, County Fermanagh, Northern Ireland) – IRA member shot at border customs post during the Border Campaign.
Aloysius Hand (2 July 1958 in Clontivern, County Fermanagh, Northern Ireland) – IRA member killed in gun battle during the Border Campaign.
James McKeown (11 May 1922 in Ballyronan, Northern Ireland) – Catholic civilian, shot in his home along with two brothers by Ulster Special Constables.
Mary McGowan (11 July 1921 in Belfast, Northern Ireland) – 13-year-old Catholic girl, shot by Ulster Special Constables firing from an armoured car during Belfast's Bloody Sunday. The inquest concluded that they had "deliberately" shot her.
 Percy Toplis (6 June 1920 in Cumberland, England)
 Maud Smith (7 June 1893 at Wormwood Scrubs, London) was killed by PC George Cooke, who was subsequently convicted of her murder and hanged.
 Michael Wise (24 August 1687 in Salisbury)

Multiple deaths in a single incident

See also
 Lists of killings by law enforcement officers
 Police use of firearms in the United Kingdom
 Shoot-to-kill policy in Northern Ireland
 Suicide by cop

References

Police
Killings by law enforcement officers
Killings by law enforcement officers
Lists of killings by law enforcement officers